Felicia wrightii is a low, up to  high, perennial, herbaceous plant with conspicuous basal leaf rosettes, and runners that end in rosettes. No fertile seeds have been found, so this species may solely reproduce vegetatively. The species is only known from one location in the KwaZulu-Natal Drakensberg, where it grows on damp stream banks.

Description 
Most leaves are in a rosette, but smaller ones sit alternately on the stalk. The rosette leaves are elliptic to inverted egg-shaped, up to 4 cm (1 in) long and 1 cm ( in) wide, with an indistinctly pointed tip, and the surface hairless or quickly becoming so, while the leaf margins are cartilaginous and set with tough bristles. The leaves one the peduncles are line-shaped, up to about 1 mm ( in) long and 1 mm (0.06 in) wide.

The flower heads sit individually at the end of unbranching stalk, that carry narrow leaves almost to the top, are hairy and are occasionally also glandular. The involucre consists of three whorls of bracts. These bracts are bristly and glandular, becoming less hairy further in. These encircle numerous disc florets with a yellow corolla of up to 3 mm (0.14 in) long. In the center of each corolla are five anthers merged into a tube, through which the style grows when the floret opens, hoovering up the pollen on its shaft. At the tip of both style branches are slightly elongated triangular appendages. Around the base of the corolla are numerous, white, clearly toothed and persistent pappus bristles of about 4 mm (0.18 in) long.

Felicia wrightii is a diploid having nine sets of homologue chromosomes (2n=18).

Taxonomy 
South African botanist Olive Mary Hilliard and English botanist Brian Burtt described Felicia wrightii in 1971, based on a specimen collected in 1967, by Wright on the banks of a tributary of the Mooi River, KwaZulu-Natal province of South Africa.

Distribution, habitat and conservation 
Felicia wrightii grows in the Kamberg Nature Reserve, that is situated in the Estcourt district of the Drakensberg Mountains in KwaZulu-Natal. However, its population is stable and appears not to be threatened. This is why it is considered critically rare.

References

External links 
 Line drawing of Felicia wrightii
 Distribution map of Felicia wrightii

wrightii
Flora of Southern Africa
Plants described in 1971